The Wellington Rugby Football Union (known as the Wellington Lions for competition reasons) are a New Zealand governing body of rugby union in the New Zealand province of Wellington Region. The main stadium is Sky Stadium (formerly named Westpac Stadium) which is located in Wellington. The union also represents the Wellington Lions, which is professional rugby union team who compete in the Mitre 10 Cup competition and contest for the Ranfurly Shield. Before 2006 the Lions competed in the National Provincial Championship.

Super Rugby
Players from Wellington who are eligible to play in the Super Rugby generally play for the Hurricanes, and traditionally contribute the core of the Hurricanes squad. This position is largely due to the Wellington basing of the Hurricanes. Further, Manawatu and Hawke's Bay, two Hurricane provinces and prolific talent producers, had long been mired in the second half of the National Provincial Championship, allowing Wellington to lure the better players of these provinces with ease (Christian Cullen from Manawatu for example). The reorganisation of provincial rugby in 2006 brought all three provinces into the Mitre 10 Cup.

National Representative Rugby

The senior Wellington representative team, the Wellington Lions play in the Mitre 10 Cup, which replaced the National Provincial Championship in 2006 as the Air New Zealand Cup. The Lions have won the provincial competition five times since its inception in 1976. The titles came in 1978, 1981, 1986, 2000 and 2022. They also  won the second tier competition, the Championship, in 2017. Their colours are gold and black as shown on the Lions jersey. The Lions play their home games at the Sky Stadium (formerly named Westpac Stadium), previously playing at Athletic Park until 1999. Even with an All-Star backline in the late 1990s including Christian Cullen, Tana Umaga, Jonah Lomu and Alama Ieremia what was a superb team on paper never lived up to expectations and Wellington became known for its inconsistency. The Lions side have made it all the way to the grand final in seven times out of the last ten years (2004-2014), losing to Auckland in 2003, to Canterbury in 2004, to Waikato in 2006, Auckland in 2007, Canterbury in 2008, 2009 and most recently 2013. In 2014 Wellington lost a record nine straight losses and were relegated to the Mitre10 Cup Championship 2015. They won the Mitre10 Championship in 2017 over Bay of Plenty 59-45 to regain promotion to the Premiership in 2018.

Ranfurly Shield

The Ranfurly Shield, colloquially known as the 'Log o' Wood', is perhaps the most prestigious trophy in New Zealand domestic rugby. First played for in 1904, the Ranfurly Shield is based on a challenge system, rather than a league or knockout competition as with most football trophies. The holding union must defend the Shield in home matches, and if a challenger defeats them, they become the new holder of the Shield.

Wellington won the first ever shield challenge winning it from Auckland in 1904 and defended it for 4 matches before losing it back to Auckland in 1905. It wouldn't be until 1914 when Wellington would get the shield back by winning it off Taranaki. This marked the longest time Wellington have held the shield successfully defending it for 15 matches until losing it again to Southland in 1920. They beat Southland a year later to regain the shield before promptly losing to Hawkes Bay after only 2 matches. Wellington held the shield for only one match in 1930 and after losing it to Canterbury they would not regain the shield until 1953. Up until the 1980s Wellington had short stints defending the shield but after losing it to Canterbury in 1982 it was to prove elusive.  Wellington suffered 10 unsuccessful challenges for the Ranfurly Shield until they took it off Auckland in 2008, scoring five tries in a 27–0 victory, on the weekend of the Auckland Union's 125th anniversary.

Wellington lost the shield to Canterbury on 29 August, losing 36–14 at the then Westpac Stadium. Canterbury then held the shield for 4 defences (over 8 weeks) before losing to Southland on 22 October. It is currently held by Waikato who defeated Hawke's Bay on 9 October 2015 by 36–30.

Bunnings NPC

All Blacks 

 Stu Wilson - 1976
 Bernie Fraser - 1979
 Allan Hewson - 1979
 Scott Crichton – 1983
 Murray Pierce – 1984
 John Gallagher - 1986
 Jon Preston – 1991
 Norm Hewitt – 1993
 Jonah Lomu – 1994
 Alama Ieremia – 1994
 Christian Cullen – 1996
 Tana Umaga – 1997
 Filo Tiatia – 2000
 Jerry Collins – 2001
 Rodney So'oialo – 2002
 Ma'a Nonu – 2003
 Piri Weepu – 2004
 Conrad Smith – 2005
 Neemia Tialata – 2005
 Ross Filipo – 2007
 John Schwalger – 2007
 Cory Jane – 2008
 Hosea Gear – 2008
 Victor Vito – 2010
 Julian Savea – 2012
 Dane Coles – 2012
 Jeremy Thrush – 2013
 Jeffrey Toomaga-Allen – 2013
 TJ Perenara – 2014
 Ardie Savea – 2016
 Vaea Fifita - 2017
 Peter Umaga-Jensen - 2020

International matches
Wellington has played a number of times against touring international rugby teams.  Wellington drew with the British and Irish Lions in 1888 and beat them in 1908, 1930 and 1966
. They have also played other international sides including South Africa, who were beaten in 1965. The Bill Freeman coached Wellington side defeated the Springboks 23–6, arguably the finest moment in Wellington rugby history.

Full results for Wellington against international touring sides:
1882 lost to New South Wales 2–14
1882 lost to New South Wales 0–8
1886 beat New South Wales 7–0
1888 drew with British team 3–3
1894 beat New South Wales 9–5
1896 beat Queensland 49–7
1901 beat New South Wales 17–16
1905 beat Australia 23–7 (combined team with Wairarapa and Horowhenua
1908 beat Anglo-Welsh 19–13
1921 lost to South Africa 3–8
1921 beat New South Wales 16–8
1923 beat New South Wales 29–16 (combined team with Manawatu)
1925 beat New South Wales 20–8 (combined team with Manawatu and Horowhenua)
1930 beat British Lions 12–8
1931 beat Australia 15–8
1937 lost to South Africa 0–29
1946 lost to Australia 15–16
1950 lost to British Isles 6–12
1956 lost to South Africa 6–8
1959 lost to British Isles 6–21
1963 lost to England 9–14
1965 beat South Africa 23–6
1966 beat British Isles 20–6
1969 lost to Wales 6–14
1971 lost to British Isles 9–47
1973 beat England 25–16
1975 lost to Scotland 25–36
1977 lost to British Isles 6–13
1979 lost to France 9–14
1980 beat Fiji 24–8

Local club rugby

Club rugby is a large part of Wellington rugby. 18 clubs currently comprise the Wellington union and all contribute at least one team to the club competitions. The premier trophy in Wellington club rugby is the Jubilee Cup, which was won in 2012 by Marist St Pat's. Petone are the club with the most Jubilee Cup successes having won the title 22 times.

Years in parenthesis are when the current club was formed, though many are amalgamations of previously extant clubs. For example, Oriental-Rongotai claim their heritage back to the formation of the Oriental club in 1888 even though the current club was formed in 1969.

Wellington FC is New Zealand's oldest continuous club.

 Avalon RFC (1980) (Lower Hutt)
 Old Boys University (1991) (Wellington)
 Eastbourne RFC (1921) (Lower Hutt)
 Hutt Old Boys-Marist RFC (1992) (Lower Hutt)
 Johnsonville RFC (1900) (Wellington)
 Marist-St Pat's RFC (1971) (Wellington)
 Northern United RFC (1989) (Porirua)
 Oriental-Rongotai FC (1969) (Wellington)
 Paremata-Plimmerton RFC (1959) Porirua)
 Petone Rugby Club (1885) (Lower Hutt)
 Poneke FC (1883) (Wellington)
 Stokes Valley RFC (1949) (Lower Hutt)
 Tawa RFC (1947) (Wellington)
 Upper Hutt Rams RFC (2014) (Upper Hutt)
 Wainuiomata RFC (1946) (Lower Hutt)
 Wellington FC (1871) (Wellington)
 Western Suburbs RFC (1983) (Wellington)

Wellington club rugby is contested over the following grades, following a change to the structure:
 Premier – Criteria based entry into the Swindale Shield with 14 clubs currently competing. The top 8 at the end of the Swindale competition go through to the Jubilee Cup, the remaining six go to the Hardham Cup.
 Premier Reserve – Contested by the 14 'B' teams of the Swindale clubs for the Harper Lock Shield. The top 2 eligible sides at the end of that round go up to the Hardham Cup (eligible in that their Premier sides qualify for the Jubilee Cup), the remaining 12 contest the Ed Chaney and HD Morgan Memorial Cups
 First Grade – Open entry grade. Clubs may enter more than one side in this competition. The first round is played for the Thompson Memorial Trophy, the second round for the Johnsonville Centeniumm Cup.
 Women's Premier – Open entry Women's grade. First round is played for the Fleurs Trophy, the second for the Victoria Tavern Trophy

Remaining grades include age-restricted (Under 21 years), weight-restricted (Under 85 kg), Reserve grade, and the non-competition presidents grade.

High School rugby is organised by College Sport Wellington, with open-age/weight (Premier), weight-restricted (Under 80 kg, 65 kg, and 55 kg), and age-restricted (Under 15 years) for boys, and an open Girls grade. Each grade then comprises several divisions.

Championship Winners
Wellington Senior Club Championship Winners since 1880:

 1880 Athletic
 1881 No Club Championship contested
 1882 Athletic
 1883 Wellington and Greytown
 1884 Athletic
 1885 Wellington
 1886 Poneke
 1887 Poneke
 1888 Poneke
 1889 Poneke
 1890 Wellington
 1891 Athletic
 1892 Poneke
 1893 Poneke
 1894 Poneke
 1895 Petone
 1896 Melrose
 1897 Melrose
 1898 Melrose
 1899 Petone
 1900 Melrose
 1901 Wellington
 1902 Melrose
 1903 Poneke
 1904 Petone
 1905 Petone
 1906 Petone
 1907 Petone
 1908 Melrose
 1909 Poneke
 1910 Oriental
 1911 Athletic
 1912 Athletic
 1913 Athletic
 1914 Athletic and Wellington
 1915 Athletic
 1916 Petone
 1917 Petone
 1918 Poneke
 1919 Poneke
 1920 Petone
 1921 Poneke
 1922 Petone
 1923 Petone
 1924 Petone
 1925 Poneke
 1926 Athletic
 1927 Wellington College Old Boys
 1928 Victoria University College

The Jubilee Cup has been played for since 1929, with the winners being:

 1929 Victoria University College
 1930 Petone
 1931 Hutt
 1932 Poneke
 1933 Wellington College Old Boys
 1934 Hutt
 1935 Petone
 1936 Athletic
 1937 Athletic
 1938 Petone
 1939 Wellington
 1940 Athletic
 1941 Athletic
 1942 Petone
 1943 Poneke-Oriental
 1944 Poneke-Oriental
 1945 Athletic
 1946 Victoria University College
 1947 Wellington
 1948 Marist Bros Old Boys
 1949 Petone/St Pat’s Old Boys
 1950 Marist Bros Old Boys
 1951 Poneke
 1952 Victoria University College
 1953 Victoria University College
 1954 Victoria University College
 1955 Onslow
 1956 Petone
 1957 Petone
 1958 Victoria University College
 1959 Petone
 1960 Marist Bros Old Boys
 1961 Petone
 1962 Marist Bros Old Boys/Onslow
 1963 Marist Bros Old Boys
 1964 Marist Bros Old Boys/ Victoria University College
 1965 Athletic
 1966 Victoria University College
 1967 Petone
 1968 Petone
 1969 Petone
 1970 Petone
 1971 Petone
 1972 Wellington/Athletic
 1973 Petone
 1974 Petone
 1975 Poneke
 1976 Petone
 1977 Athletic
 1978 Marist St Pat’s/Wellington
 1979 Marist St Pat’s
 1980 Petone
 1981 Marist St Pat’s
 1982 Wellington/Petone
 1983 Wellington
 1984 Marist St Pat’s
 1985 Wellington
 1986 Petone
 1987 Wellington
 1988 Marist St Pat’s
 1989 Petone
 1990 Petone
 1991 Hutt Old Boys 
 1992 Petone
 1993 Petone
 1994 Marist St Pat’s
 1995 Marist St Pat’s
 1996 Poneke
 1997 Marist St Pat’s
 1998 Western Suburbs
 1999 Marist St Pat’s
 2000 Petone
 2001 Marist St Pat’s
 2002 Marist St Pat’s
 2003 Poneke
 2004 Northern United
 2005 Petone
 2006 Northern United
 2007 Hutt Old Boys Marist
 2008 Marist St Pat's/Northern United
 2009 Marist St Pat’s
 2010 Northern United
 2011 Oriental-Rongotai
 2012 Marist St Pat's
 2013 Tawa
 2014 Hutt Old Boys Marist
 2015 Old Boy's University
 2016 Tawa
 2017 Old Boy's University
 2018 Old Boy's University
 2019 Northern United
 2020 Old Boy's University
 2021 Tawa
 2022 Northern United

Jersey
Main sponsor is Stonewood Homes. Apparel is supplied by Paladin. Other major sponsors include:
 Rutherford & Bond Toyota, Ricoh, Tui, Burger King

Women's Rugby
Wellington has a women's team that are part of the Women's Provincial Championship, called the Wellington Pride. Wellington Pride is the only team aside from Auckland to have won the Women's Championship.

References

External links
Official site
Wellington Lions
Wellington rugby (NZHistory.net.nz)

 
New Zealand rugby union teams
New Zealand rugby union governing bodies
Rugby Football Union
Sports organizations established in 1879